Enel Generación Chile S.A., formerly known as Endesa Chile and Empresa Nacional de Electricidad, is  the largest electric utility company in Chile. It was created as a subsidiary of the state-owned CORFO on 1 December 1943 and was privatized in 1989. As of April 2009, it is owned by Enersis with a 60% stake, which in turn is 61% owned by Endesa International SA, a wholly owned subsidiary of the Spanish Endesa Group. Besides Chile, the Company has investments in Argentina, Colombia and Peru.  It also has unconsolidated equity investments in companies engaged primarily in the electricity generation, transmission and distribution business in Brazil.
Endesa Chile owns a 51% stake in the controversial HidroAysén project in Aisén Region, which would build 5 hydropower dams on two of Chile's largest wild rivers, the Baker and the Pascua. As of the 17 December 2009, Jorge Rosenblut has been the President of Endesa. Enel has signed a contract to deliver renewable power to SCM Minera Lumina Copper Chile starting in January 2021.

See also 

 Chapiquiña power plant
 HidroAysén
 Ralco Hydroelectric Plant 
 Endesa (Spain)
 Colbún S.A.

References

External links
Enel Chile

Companies listed on the Santiago Stock Exchange
Companies listed on the New York Stock Exchange
Enel
Electric power companies of Chile
Chilean companies established in 1943
Companies listed on the Madrid Stock Exchange
Energy companies established in 1943